Thomas Nelson Barnes (November 16, 1930 – March 17, 2003) was an airman in the United States Air Force who served as the 4th Chief Master Sergeant of the Air Force from October 1973 to July 1977, the first African American in that position. He was also the first African-American Senior Enlisted Advisor in any of the Armed Forces of the United States. He was key in bringing many African-American related issues to the attention of senior military leaders.

Military career
Barnes enlisted the United States Air Force in April 1949 and received his basic training at Lackland Air Force Base in Texas. He later attended Aircraft and Engine School and Hydraulic Specialist School at the Chanute Technical Training Center in Illinois. In October 1950 he was assigned to the 4th Troop Carrier Squadron of the 62nd Troop Carrier Group at McChord Air Force Base, Washington.

In November 1950, aged 20, Barnes transferred with the 4th Troop Carrier Squadron to Ashiya, Japan, in support of the Korean War. Shortly after arrival in Japan, he completed on-the-job training for flight engineer duties. Then, due to low unit manning, he performed both flight engineer and hydraulic specialist duties. In September 1951 he transferred to Tachikawa, Japan, and continued flight engineer duties.

Barnes transferred in June 1952 to the 30th Air Transport Squadron, Westover Air Force Base, Massachusetts, where he attended C-118 school and continued his flight engineer duties in that aircraft. In September 1952, he volunteered for temporary duty with the 1708th Ferrying Group at Kelly Air Force Base, Texas, and participated in ferrying aircraft from various depots to Air Force organizations in Hawaii, Japan and Northeast Air Command. Upon completion of temporary duty, he returned to Westover.

Barnes transferred to Andrews Air Force Base in December 1952, and served as crew chief and flight engineer on B-25, T-11, C-45 and C-47 aircraft in support of various requirements of Headquarters United States Air Force, Headquarters Military Air Transport Service, and the Air Research and Development Command. It was during this time that Barnes applied for commissioning and was accepted but had to turn down the opportunity because the pay cut which officer candidates experience while undergoing training would not allow him to continue to support his wife and children.

Barnes transferred in June 1958 to the 42nd Bombardment Wing at Loring Air Force Base, Maine, in June 1958 and served as a B-52 crew chief, flight chief and senior controller. In September 1965 he went to Fairchild Air Force Base, Washington, and continued duties as senior controller. In October 1966, he entered the F-4 Field Training Detachment at George Air Force Base, California, and in December 1966 went to Southeast Asia. There he served with the 8th Tactical Fighter Wing as noncommissioned officer in charge, reparable processing center; senior controller; and noncommissioned officer in charge, maintenance control.

Barnes returned from Southeast Asia to Laughlin Air Force Base, Texas, in December 1967, where his duties were T-38 section line chief; noncommissioned officer in charge, maintenance control; and senior enlisted advisor to the commander of the 3646th Pilot Training Wing. He was promoted to the grade of chief master sergeant on December 1, 1969, and was transferred to Headquarters Air Training Command in October 1971 to assume duties as command senior enlisted adviser.

On October 1, 1973, Barnes was appointed Chief Master Sergeant of the Air Force. At the expiration of the initial two-year tenure, he was extended for an additional year by the Chief of Staff. In February 1976 he was selected by the Chief of Staff to serve an unprecedented second year extension. He retired on July 31, 1977. He flew for nine years as a flight engineer on a variety of aircraft, seeing duty in Korea, the Cuban Missile Crisis, and Vietnam.

Later life
Following his retirement from the Air Force, Barnes worked at the First National Bank of Fort Worth as an Employee Relations Officer for seven years. He was then hired by the Associates Corporation of North America and promoted to Vice President/Director of Employee Relations at the corporate headquarters in Las Colinas. After retiring to Fannin County, Texas, he raised Longhorn cattle and two years in a row won the team penning at the Kueckelhan Rodeo.

Barnes died from cancer on March 17, 2003, in Sherman, Texas, where he had been undergoing treatment.

Awards and decorations

References

External links

 Obituary
 Maxwell AFB Site
 Defense Link Biography
 Biodata

1930 births
2003 deaths
Activists for African-American civil rights
Activists from Texas
Chief Master Sergeants of the United States Air Force
United States Air Force personnel of the Korean War
Recipients of the Legion of Merit
Recipients of the Air Medal
People from Chester, Pennsylvania
People from Delaware County, Pennsylvania
People from Sherman, Texas
Deaths from cancer in Texas
Recipients of the Meritorious Service Medal (United States)